The women's team pursuit race of the 2013–14 ISU Speed Skating World Cup 2, arranged in the Utah Olympic Oval, in Salt Lake City, United States, was held on November 17, 2013.

The Dutch team – comprised by Ireen Wüst, Antoinette de Jong and Linda de Vries – won the race, while the Canadian team came second, and the American team came third.

Results
The race took place on Sunday, November 17, in the afternoon session, scheduled at 16:23.

References

Women team pursuit
2